The 2019 Internazionali Femminili di Palermo was a professional women's tennis tournament played on outdoor clay courts at the Country Time Club. It was the 27th edition of the tournament which was part of the 2019 WTA Tour. It took place in Palermo, Italy between 22 and 28 July 2019. The tournament made a return to the WTA Tour after a five-year absence (2014–2018).

Singles main draw entrants

Seeds 

 Rankings are as of July 15, 2019

Other entrants 
The following players received wildcards into the singles main draw:
  Sara Errani 
  Giulia Gatto-Monticone
  Martina Trevisan

The following player received entry using a protected ranking into the main draw:
  Anna-Lena Friedsam

The following player received entry as a special exempt into the main draw:
  Martina Di Giuseppe

The following players received entry from the qualifying draw:
  Gabriela Cé
  Elisabetta Cocciaretto
  Jaimee Fourlis 
  Amandine Hesse
  Tereza Mrdeža 
  Jessica Pieri

The following players received entry as lucky losers:
  Georgina García Pérez
  Liudmila Samsonova
  Fanny Stollár

Withdrawals 
Before the tournament
  Timea Bacsinszky → replaced by  Liudmila Samsonova
  Mona Barthel → replaced by  Arantxa Rus
  Aliona Bolsova  → replaced by  Antonia Lottner
  Martina Di Giuseppe → replaced by  Fanny Stollár
  Julia Görges → replaced by  Irina-Camelia Begu
  Polona Hercog → replaced by  Lara Arruabarrena
  Mandy Minella → replaced by  Georgina García Pérez
  Karolína Muchová → replaced by  Paula Badosa
  Anna Karolína Schmiedlová → replaced by  Stefanie Vögele
  Zhang Shuai → replaced by  Ekaterine Gorgodze

Retirements 
  Antonia Lottner (gastrointestinal illness)

Doubles main draw entrants

Seeds 

 1 Rankings are as of July 15, 2019

Other entrants 
The following pairs received wildcards into the doubles main draw:
  Federica Bilardo /  Dalila Spiteri
  Elisabetta Cocciaretto /  Federica Rossi

Withdrawals 
Before the tournament
  Martina Di Giuseppe (viral illness)

Retirements 
During the tournament
  Rosalie van der Hoek (gastrointestinal illness)

Finals

Singles 

  Jil Teichmann defeated  Kiki Bertens, 7–6(7–3), 6–2

Doubles 

  Cornelia Lister /  Renata Voráčová defeated  Ekaterine Gorgodze /  Arantxa Rus, 7–6(7–2), 6–2

References

External links 
 Official website

Internazionali Femminili di Palermo
Internazionali Femminili di Palermo
2019 in Italian women's sport
Internazionali Femminili di Palermo
Torneo